Filip Andrzej Kaczmarek (born 22 November 1966 in Poznań) is a Polish politician and
Member of the European Parliament

Private life
Filip Kaczmarek was born in Poznań, graduated from the History Department at Adam Mickiewicz University in Poznań and in 2005 earned a PhD in Political Sciences at Adam Mickiewicz University.  His wife Beata Machowska-Kaczmarek is a journalist and his son Ignacy is a junior high student.

Politics: Local government
In the beginning of the 90’s he was the Chairman of the National Coordination Committee for the Independent Students’ Union at Adam Mickiewicz University. In 1994 Filip Kaczmarek took part in the foundation of the Young Democrats Association. As a member of the Sejm of first tenure (1991–1993) he was inter alia a member of the Parliamentary Committee on the Europe Agreement. In 2001 Filip Kaczmarek took part in founding the Civic Platform in Poznań. He was also a co-founder of the Civic Platform Councillors Club of Poznań City Council and the Civic Platform structures in Poznań. From 1998 to 2002 Filip Kaczmarek was the Councillor and Deputy Leader of Poznań City Council. In 2003 he created the European Funds Bureau in Poznań City Council becoming its first director. Since 2010 he is the head of Civic Platform in Poznań.

Europe
For several years Filip Kaczmarek has been concerned with European matters. When he was a member of the Sejm in 1992 he postulated that Poland should apply for complete membership in the European Communities. In 1993 he was a co-founder of an organisation that later was transformed into the Centre for European Research and Education in Poznań.  In 1996 Filip Kaczmarek was a co-initiator of International Youth Centre in Mikuszewo. Until 2007 he was the Chairman of the Independent Initiatives Association. The Association organized among other things the European Youth Meeting (Poznań 2003). In 1996 he received a scholarship from The German Marshall Fund of the United States.

European Parliament
Since 2004 Filip Kaczmarek has been a Member of the European Parliament, where he belongs to the European People's Party like other Civic Party MEPs. Currently he is the Coordinator of EPP Group in the Committee on Development that brings help to the developing countries and supports democratic transformations in these countries. Filip Kaczmarek is also a member of the Committee on Agriculture and Rural Development where he is mostly concerned with the Polish agriculturists’ business.
In 2009 his work in the Committee on Development was appreciated and he received an award for the best MEP in the category of development politics.
Apart from that he is a member of the Delegation for relations with the Pan-African Parliament, the Delegation to the ACP-EU Joint Parliamentary Assembly and a deputy member of the Delegation for relations with Israel.

Filip Kaczmarek is a member of 5 intergroups:
 Tibet Intergroup
 Intergroup on Ageing
 Sport Intergroup
 Urban Intergroup
 SME Intergroup

He belongs to the following Parliamentary Groups:
 EP Caucus on Burma
 The Association of European Parliamentarians with Africa –AWEPA
 EP Taiwan Friendship Group
 EP Rugby Union Intergroup
 EP Beer Club
 The European Advocates for Epilepsy Working Group
 EP Working Group on Roma-people
 EU-Nepal Friendship Group

In the EPP Group he is:
 a Member of the Political Bureau of the European People's Party
 a Member of the EPP Management Board Bureau
 the Coordinator of the Committee on Development
 the Coordinator of ACP-EU Joint Parliamentary Assembly
 a Member of SME Circle that concerns small and medium-sized enterprises (the EPP Group is the only EP Party that entirely recognises SME’s role in providing workplaces in Europe)

See also
 2004 European Parliament election in Poland

External links
 
 
 

Kaczmarek, Filip Andrzej
Kaczmarek, Filip Andrzej
Kaczmarek, Filip Andrzej
Kaczmarek, Filip Andrzej
Kaczmarek, Filip Andrzej